This article is a list of America East Conference champions.

Men's Cross Country

Women's Cross Country

Field Hockey 
Currently, field hockey is the only America East sport conducted in a divisional format. This was introduced for the 2015 season after four California schools joined the conference as single-sport associate members.

Men's Soccer

Women's Soccer

Volleyball

Men's Basketball

Women's Basketball

Men's Swimming and Diving

Women's Swimming and Diving

Men's Indoor Track and Field

Women's Indoor Track and Field

Baseball

Men's Golf 
Note: The 1997, 1998 and 1999 tournaments were contested in the fall of that academic year, instead of the usual spring tournament.  Therefore, these titles were actually awarded in 1996, 1997 and 1998, respectively.Note: America East disbanded Men's Golf after the 2007 season.

Women's Golf 
Note: America East disbanded Women's Golf after the 2009 season.

Men's Lacrosse

Women's Lacrosse

Softball

Men's Tennis 
Note: The 1988, 1989 and 1990 tournaments were held in the fall of their respective academic years.  Starting in 1991, the season was contested over a full academic year, and the tournaments were held in the spring.

Women's Tennis 
Note: Until 1998, the tournament was held in the fall of the respective academic years.  Starting in 1998, the season was contested over a full academic year, and the tournaments were held in the spring.

Men's Outdoor Track and Field

Women's Outdoor Track and Field

References

Champions
America East